Fractured Follies (Chinese: 長短腳之戀; Pinyin: cháng duǎn jiǎo zhī liàn) is a 1988 Hong Kong romantic comedy film directed by Wong Chung, it stars Chow Yun-fat, Joey Wong, James Wong, Nina Li Chi, Wong Ching, Bonnie Law and Mengxia Zheng. The film ran in theaters from 7 July 1988 until 25 July 1988.

Plot 
May (Joey Wong), is a girl who was born with one leg an inch shorter than a normal person. One day while she and her family was cleaning their supermarket they had just bought, May gets hit by a taxi driven by Joe (Chow Yun-fat). Thinking he is the one that crippled May, he volunteers to work for May's family supermarket to repay her medical bills. Scarlet (Nina Li Chi), May's cousin, has her sights set on Joe, but Joe himself was falling for May. After some advice from the Buddha, Joe finally has the courage to ask May out. On the other hand, Joe's friend Sea (Wong Ching) was falling for Scarlet, with Joe's help, he managed to win her heart.

Cast 
 Chow Yun-fat as Joe Leung (梁少祖) - May's spouse, taxi driver before he worked for May's family
 Joey Wong as May Yau (游靜文) - Joe's spouse, born with one leg an inch shorter than a normal person
 James Wong as Yau Kwong Nam (游江南) - May's father
 Nina Li Chi as Scarlet (紅菱) - Has a crush on Joe, married to Sea in the end
 Wong Ching as Sea (梁少海) - Scarlet's spouse
 Bonnie Law as Cher Leung (梁小珊) - Joe and Sea's friend, gets scammed by a producer for nudes
 Cheng Mang-Ha as May's grandmother 
 Chan Lap-Ban as Matchmaker
 Gam Lui as Porno cd producer boss
 Pei Yun as Temple worshipper
 Wang Yi-Fei as Nam's cousin (cameo)
 Lung Tin-Sang as Guest at Joe's wedding (uncredited)
 Lee Sam as Robber (uncredited)

Critical response 
"Okay, so it's not sophisticated humor, but this is a great comedy romance with two HK greats, Chow Yun-Fat and Joey Wong......The romance between Joe and May is sweet and has some awfully cute moments......Lots of fun. Put your brain in neutral and give it a watch." ----- IMDb (6.0/10 based on 143 user reviews) 

"Fractured Follies is a pleasant little romantic comedy that isn't anything that's really going to make you laugh out loud or cry your eyes out, but it's not going to make you clutch your head in disbelief, either.......Fractured Follies accomplishes what it ostensibly set out to do -- deliver some nice fluffy entertainment." ----- hkfilm.net (6/10) 

On the Chinese movie review website, Douban, it received an average rating of 6.8 out of 10 based on 6599 user reviews.

References

External links 

Fractured Follies at Hong Kong Cinemagic